"You Can Call Me Al" is a song by American singer-songwriter Paul Simon. It was the lead single from his seventh studio album, Graceland (1986), released on Warner Bros. Records. Written by Simon, its lyrics follow an individual seemingly experiencing a midlife crisis. Its lyrics were partially inspired by Simon's trip to South Africa and experience with its culture. Released in August 1986, "You Can Call Me Al" became one of Simon's biggest solo hits, reaching the top five in seven countries.

Background and composition
The names in the song came from an incident at a party that Simon went to with his then-wife Peggy Harper. French composer and conductor Pierre Boulez, who was attending the same party, mistakenly referred to Paul as "Al" and to Peggy as "Betty", inspiring Simon to write a song.

Jon Pareles noted that the lyrics can be interpreted as describing a man experiencing a midlife crisis ("Where's my wife and family? What if I die here? Who'll be my role model?"). However, as Simon himself explained during the Graceland episode of the Classic Albums documentary series, by the third verse the lyrics move from a generic portrait-like perspective to a personal and autobiographical one, as he describes his journey to South Africa which inspired the entire album.

The song opens simply, with its protagonist wondering aloud why his life is difficult, amid other questions. Simon structured the song's lyrics in a way that listeners would be given the simplest information first, before getting abstract with his imagery in the song's third verse: "Because there's been a structure, [...] those abstract images, they will come down and fall into one of the slots that the mind has already made up about the structure of the song."

Recording and production
"You Can Call Me Al" was recorded entirely at The Hit Factory in New York City in April 1986; it differs from much of Graceland in that regard, because most songs on the record were recorded in numerous locales worldwide.

Some of the saxophone textures heard on "You Can Call Me Al" were created by Adrian Belew on a guitar synthesizer. "I had written a variety of saxophone emulations from baritone to alto which had a realistic yet unorthodox quality. He [Simon] spelled out each part exactly as he wanted them for the iconic beginning of the song. They may have added real saxophones later but my synthesized saxophones are definitely there as well. I’m sure very few people realize that."

Synthesizer player Rob Mounsey arranged and conducted the horn section – eight brass and a bass saxophone – and contributed heavily to the track's arrangement and groove. The song features a bass run performed by Bakithi Kumalo; the solo is palindromic as only the first half was recorded, and was then played backwards for the second half. The decision to reverse the recording was made by Simon's long-time engineer Roy Halee, who noted in a later interview that this type of experimentation was common in order to make the songs more interesting. The penny whistle solo was performed by jazz musician Morris Goldberg.

After the song's completion, it was mixed at The Hit Factory alongside the rest of Graceland, at an average of two days per song. Simon's vocals on the song are rather quick-paced, which made them difficult to mix over the numerous instruments in the backing track. After much work on the track, Halee used tape delays feeding separately into the two audio channels, which made the vocals clear.

Reception
Billboard said it was one of Simon's most intricate verbal tour de forces, and said that "the melody moves along to beguiling Afro-Caribbean polyrhythms."

Chart performance
In the United States, "You Can Call Me Al" initially fared poorly, reaching number 44 on the Billboard Hot 100 in September 1986. As sales and acclaim for Graceland grew, culminating in a win for Album of the Year at the 29th Annual Grammy Awards in February 1987, the single experienced a resurgence in sales and airplay. After making a second entry on the Billboard Hot 100 in March, the song rose to a peak of number 23 in May 1987. The song reached the top 10 of several European charts. In the UK, it became his biggest solo hit, spending five weeks in the top 10 and peaking at number four in October 1986. It has since been certified double platinum in the UK.

Music videos
Simon did not like the original music video that was made, which was a performance of the song Simon gave during the monologue when he hosted Saturday Night Live in the perspective of a video monitor. A replacement video was conceived partly by Lorne Michaels and directed by Gary Weis, wherein Saturday Night Live alumnus Chevy Chase lip-synced Simon's vocals, with gestures punctuating the lyrics as Simon lip-synced to the backing vocals and brought in various instruments to play when they respectively appear in the song. The  Chase moving in unison with the  Simon also provides an amusing juxtaposition.

Personnel

 Paul Simon – lead vocals, backing vocals, 6-string electric bass
 Rob Mounsey – synthesizer, horn arrangements (uncredited on album)
 Adrian Belew – guitar synthesizer
 Ray Phiri – guitar
 Bakithi Kumalo – bass
 Isaac Mtshali – drums
 Ralph MacDonald – percussion
 James Guyatt – percussion
 Ronnie Cuber – baritone saxophone, bass saxophone
 Dave Bargeron – trombone
 Kim Allan Cissel – trombone
 Randy Brecker – trumpet
 Jon Faddis – trumpet
 Alan Rubin – trumpet
 Lew Soloff – trumpet
 Morris Goldberg – penny whistle
 Ladysmith Black Mambazo – backing vocals (uncredited)

Charts

Weekly charts

Year-end charts

Certifications

In popular culture 
 The song is performed in a 2015 episode of Portlandia, Season 5, Episode 9, "You Can Call Me Al". The performance features an appearance by Simon himself.
 The music video is parodied in Mikal Cronin's 2015 music video, "Say".

Notes
References

Sources

External links
 

Paul Simon songs
1986 singles
1986 songs
Songs written by Paul Simon
Song recordings produced by Paul Simon
Warner Records singles
Music videos directed by Gary Weis